Manuel Campos (born 12 July 1981) is a Portuguese gymnast. He competed at the 2012 Summer Olympics.

References

External links
 

1981 births
Living people
Portuguese male artistic gymnasts
Olympic gymnasts of Portugal
Gymnasts at the 2012 Summer Olympics
Sportspeople from Porto
21st-century Portuguese people